Francis of Bourbon or François de Bourbon may refer to:

 Francis, Count of Vendôme (1470–1495), also 1st duke of Estouteville
 Francis de Bourbon, Count of St. Pol (1491–1545)
 François, Count of Enghien (1519–1546), count of Enghien
 Francis of Bourbon (1536/37–1546), 2nd duke of Estouteville
 François, Duke of Montpensier (1542–1592)
 François de Bourbon, prince de Conti (1558–1614)
 François de Vendôme, Duc de Beaufort (1616–1669)
 François Louis, Prince of Conti (1664–1709)
 Francis of Bourbon (1722–1793), baron of Busset
 Francis I of the Two Sicilies (1777–1830), king 
 Francis of Bourbon (1782–1856), baron of Busset
 Prince Francis, Count of Trapani (1827–1892), prince of the Two Sicilies, count of Trapani
 Francis II of the Two Sicilies (1836–1894), king 
 Francis of Bourbon (1837–1918), count of Mascali
 Francisco de Paula de Borbón y Castellví (1853–1942)
 Francis of Bourbon (1861–1923), duke of Marchena
 Francis of Bourbon (1873–1876), prince of the Two Sicilies
 Francis of Bourbon (1875–1954), baron of Busset
 Francis of Bourbon (1882–1952), duke of Seville
 Francis of Bourbon (1888–1914), prince of the Two Sicilies
 Francis of Bourbon (1912–1995)
 Francis of Bourbon (1913–1939), prince of Parma
 Francis of Bourbon (1917–2003)
 Francisco de Borbón y Escasany, 5th Duke of Seville (born 1943)
 Francis of Bourbon (born 1960), prince of the Two Sicilies
 , duke of Bourbon